World Wide Knit in Public Day was started in 2005 by Danielle Landes and takes place on the second Saturday of June each year. It began as a way for knitters to come together and enjoy each other's company.

Knit in Public Day is the largest knitter run event in the world. Each local event is put together by a volunteer or a group of volunteers. They bring their own fresh ideas into planning where the event should be held, and what people would like to do.

In the past some people have used this event as a means to show the general public that "not only grannies knit". Knit in Public Day is about showing the general public that knitting can be a community activity in a very distinct way. In some places there are many different knitting groups that never interact with each other, except on Knit in Public Day when they come together in one place, making them hard to miss.

2005 there were about 25 local events around the world. In 2006 there were about 70 local events, and in 2007 there were almost 200.

Over the years there have been local events in Australia, China, Serbia, England, Finland, France, Ireland, Norway, Poland, Slovenia, South Africa, Sweden, United States, and Germany.

See also
 Stitch and Bitch London
 I Knit London

References

External links
 World Wide Knit in Public Day: 

Knitting